Robert McElhinney (ca. 1747 – April 22, 1831) was an Irish-born political figure in Nova Scotia. He represented Londonderry Township in the Nova Scotia House of Assembly from 1790 to 1799.

He came to Nova Scotia in the 1760s. In 1821, he married the widow Margaret Davis. He died at Londonderry, Nova Scotia at the age of 84.

References 
 A Directory of the Members of the Legislative Assembly of Nova Scotia, 1758-1958, Public Archives of Nova Scotia (1958)

1831 deaths
Nova Scotia pre-Confederation MLAs
Year of birth uncertain